University of International Business and Economics or University of Economics and Business may refer to:

University of International Business and Economics
University of International Business and Economics (Beijing)
Liaoning University of International Business and Economics
Shanghai University of International Business and Economics

University of Economics and Business
Athens University of Economics and Business
Capital University of Economics and Business, Beijing
Hebei University of Economics and Business
Poznań University of Economics and Business
Vienna University of Economics and Business

See also

Nova School of Business and Economics
School of Economics and Business, Ljubljana
School of Economics and Business Sarajevo
John Chambers College of Business and Economics